Laura Montoya (26 May 1874 – 21 October 1949) – known in religion as Laura of Saint Catherine of Siena – was a Colombian Roman Catholic religious sister and the founder of the Congregation of the Missionary Sisters of the Immaculate Virgin Mary and Saint Catherine of Siena (1914). She was well known for her work with Indigenous peoples and for acting as a strong role model for South American girls.

Pope John Paul II beatified her in 2004 and Pope Francis canonized her as a saint on 12 May 2013. Montoya is the first Colombian to be made a saint.

Life

María Laura de Jesús Montoya Upegui was born on 26 May 1874 in Jericó in the United States of Colombia as the second of three children to Juan de la Cruz Montoya and Dolores Upegui; she was baptized that same day. Her siblings were older sister Carmelina and younger brother Juan de la Cruz; a maternal cousin was Luisa Upegui. During the Colombian Civil War of 1876 her father was killed and the household left poor as a result of this. Therefore she was sent to live with her maternal grandmother; her grandfather was Lucio Upegui.

In 1881 the precarious economic condition saw her sent to an orphanage that her maternal aunt María de Jesús Upegui, a nun, managed. This aunt in 1890 enrolled her at "Normale de Institutoras" of Medellín to receive training to become a school teacher as a means of having an income to support the financial difficulties her mother faced. She was educated at the Escuela de Espíritu Santo in Amalfi and then in Medellín. In 1886 she went to live on a farm to care for an ill aunt and it was there that her desire to become a religious began. Montoya graduated as a teacher in 1893.

In 1908 she began working with the natives in the Uraba and Sarare regions where she founded the "Works of the Indians". Montoya wanted to become a cloistered Carmelite nun but felt growing within her the desire to spread the Gospel to those who had never met Jesus Christ. Montoya wanted to eliminate the existing racial discrimination and to sacrifice herself in order to bring them Christ's love and teachings.

On 14 May 1917, she started the "Congregation of Missionary Sisters of the Immaculate Virgin Mary and Saint Catherine of Siena". She left Medellín with four other women and went to Dabeiba to live among the native Indians. Even though this new order had the support of the Bishop of Santa Fe de Antioquia it was criticized even within Christian groups.

Montoya died after a prolonged illness on 21 October 1949 in Medellín in Colombia. The last nine years of her life were lived in a wheelchair due to this. Her order at present operates in a total of nineteen countries throughout the Americas as well as in Africa and Europe.

Sainthood

The process for sanctification opened in Medellín in an informative process that Archbishop Tulio Botero Salazr opened on 24 June 1963 and later closed on 14 May 1964; theologians later collected and approved her spiritual writings on 22 June 1973 after assessing that such writings were in line with doctrine. An apostolic process was then held there from 16 August 1976 to 19 December 1977 while this and the informative process received validation from the Congregation for the Causes of Saints on 22 January 1982.

Montoya became titled as a Servant of God under Pope Paul VI on 5 April 1976 with the formal introduction of the cause.

The postulation submitted the Positio to the C.C.S. in 1988 which allowed for theologians to issue their assent to the cause on 12 December 1989 and for the C.C.S. to also approve it on 23 October 1990. Montoya became titled as Venerable on 22 January 1991 after Pope John Paul II confirmed that the late religious led a model life of heroic virtue.

The miracle needed for beatification was located and investigated in the diocese of its origin and received C.C.S. validation on 25 January 2002 in Rome while a medical board later approved this miracle on 17 October 2002; theologians followed suit on 1 April 2003 as did the C.C.S. on 3 June 2003. John Paul II approved this healing to be a credible miracle attributed to Montoya's intercession on 7 July 2003 and later beatified her on 25 April 2004 in Saint Peter's Square. The beatification miracle involved the 1994 cure of a woman (aged 86) from uterine cancer.

The second miracle – and the one required for full sanctification – was investigated and later received validation on 7 November 2008. The medical board granted their assent to it on 14 June 2012 while theologians likewise approved it on 12 October 2012; the C.C.S. issued their own approval on 10 December 2012. Pope Benedict XVI approved this on 20 December 2012 and scheduled her canonization at a consistory on 11 February 2013 – which included the pontiff's resignation.

The retired pope's successor Pope Francis canonized her as a saint on 12 May 2013. The canonization miracle involves the healing of Doctor Carlos Eduardo Restrepo who was suffering from lupus as well as kidney damage and muscular degeneration. The doctor was said to be cured after requesting the intercession of the then-beatified Montoya.

The postulator at the time of Montoya's canonization was Silvia Mónica Correale.

See also 
 List of Colombian saints

References

External links
Hagiography Circle
Saints SQPN

1874 births
1949 deaths
20th-century Christian saints
20th-century Roman Catholics
20th-century Colombian women
Beatifications by Pope John Paul II
Canonizations by Pope Francis
Christian female saints of the Late Modern era
Colombian people of Basque descent
Colombian Roman Catholic saints
Colombian Roman Catholic religious sisters and nuns
Founders of Catholic religious communities
People from Antioquia Department
Venerated Catholics by Pope John Paul II